WELP is a religious radio station located in Easley, South Carolina. The station is licensed by the Federal Communications Commission (FCC) to broadcast on 1360 kHz with 5,000 watts of power during the day and 36 watts at night.

References

External links
 WELP's webpage

ELP